Sonchat Ratiwatana, nicknamed Ton (born January 23, 1982, in Bangkok) is a professional tennis player from Thailand. In 2007, Sonchat and his twin brother Sanchai Ratiwatana won their first ATP doubles title in Bangkok in their home country. In the final, the team beat 2007 Wimbledon men's doubles winner Michaël Llodra and 2007 U.S. Open men's doubles semifinalist Nicolas Mahut. He reached his highest doubles ranking at world number 39 as of 28 April 2008. He plays right-handed and turned professional in 2004. He and his twin brother played in their first grand slam tournament during the Australian Open in 2008,  where they lost to the eventual finalist pairing of Arnaud Clément & Michaël Llodra of France in the first round.

ATP career finals

Doubles: 3 (2 titles, 1 runner-up)

Grand Slam doubles timeline

References

External links

Sonchat Ratiwatana
Sonchat Ratiwatana
1982 births
Living people
Sonchat Ratiwatana
Asian Games medalists in tennis
Tennis players at the 2006 Asian Games
Tennis players at the 2010 Asian Games
Tennis players at the 2014 Asian Games
Tennis players at the 2018 Asian Games
Identical twins
Twin sportspeople
Sonchat Ratiwatana
Tennis players at the 2016 Summer Olympics
Sonchat Ratiwatana
Sonchat Ratiwatana
Sonchat Ratiwatana
Medalists at the 2006 Asian Games
Medalists at the 2014 Asian Games
Medalists at the 2018 Asian Games
Universiade medalists in tennis
Sonchat Ratiwatana
Sonchat Ratiwatana
Sonchat Ratiwatana
Southeast Asian Games medalists in tennis
Competitors at the 2005 Southeast Asian Games
Competitors at the 2007 Southeast Asian Games
Competitors at the 2009 Southeast Asian Games
Competitors at the 2011 Southeast Asian Games
Competitors at the 2015 Southeast Asian Games
Competitors at the 2017 Southeast Asian Games
Sonchat Ratiwatana
Sonchat Ratiwatana
Competitors at the 2019 Southeast Asian Games
Medalists at the 2003 Summer Universiade
Medalists at the 2007 Summer Universiade